Craghoppers is a British outdoor clothing manufacturer and supplier. It was founded in Batley, West Yorkshire in 1965 and is now based in Manchester, United Kingdom.

History
In 1965, British outdoor clothing brand G & H Products became one of the pioneers of using nylon in its garments. The brand's founders, Brian Gaskin and Roy Holmes (from Batley, West Yorkshire), were outdoor walking, climbing, and pot-holing enthusiasts. After successful design achievements (including the creation of the "Cagjack") they were approached by the mountaineering expedition team of Chris Bonington to design their weather wear for the successful 1975 Everest Expedition.

Gaskin designed the Everest garments himself. This propelled G & H Products to new heights, and, with fresh capital, they discovered the Clarke Brothers in Hebden Bridge who made walking trousers and breeches. Craghoppers was sold when the brothers retired. G&H Products bought Craghoppers, keeping the name. The company was in financial difficulties and was later sold and taken over by the Regatta Group in 1995. In 2008, Craghoppers partnered with survival expert Bear Grylls. The company produced many of his extreme condition clothes.

In October 2014, Craghoppers became an exclusive National Geographic's licensed apparel partner for North America.

Ranges
Craghoppers produce two ranges a year – spring/summer (available to consumers from February) and Autumn/Winter (available to consumers from September). Each range features products specifically for that season such as insulated jackets for winter and shorts, tees, and sandals in summer. The range includes clothing and accessories for men, women, and children as well as footwear, rucksacks, and luggage.

Clothing
 
They have designed and promoted the following technologies:
 NosiLife – Clothing with a non-toxic permanent insect repellent finish
 Breathable fabrics
 Stretch fabric
 SolarDry fabrics which give UV protection, it is currently rated as having an up to 50+ UPF (Ultraviolet protection factor) index and block 98+% of UVR (Ultraviolet radiation)
 Wash & Wear fabrics – used for travel clothing where clothes dry overnight and need no or minimal ironing
 AquaDry & AquaDry Stretch – Clothing which incorporates waterproof and breathable fabrics, also available in stretch fabrics
 Lightweight clothing

Craghoppers are one of several companies that meet Gore-Tex standards and are authorised to use and sell with Gore-Tex waterproof technologies. Many items of Craghoppers clothing have a hidden zippable security pocket.

They also produce luggage, softshell jackets, synthetic insulated jackets, and accessories such as caps and scarves. Their Kiwi walking trousers, with 8 million pairs sold, are popular with ramblers.

Conservation projects
In 2013, Craghoppers joined the European Outdoor Conservation Association. In February 2015, the firm introduced a fleece made from recycled plastic bottles.

Partners

English Heritage
Craghoppers has partnered with English Heritage, sponsoring its Stonehenge Cycle Challenge and Hadrian's Wall Hike. English Heritage cares for places of historic significance in England such as Roman forts and medieval castles.

Dian Fossey
Craghoppers partnered with the Dian Fossey Gorilla Fund International, a charity that protects gorillas and their habitats in Africa. Craghoppers has been supplying kits to the Dian Fossey team who work in the Virunga rainforest in Rwanda. Dian Fossey T-shirts were also sold to raise awareness and money for the charity.

In April 2015, Craghoppers also premiered a documentary film called "Hope" detailing the work that the Dian Fossey Gorilla Fund carry out. The film was made by Craghoppers' ambassador, Peter McBride and narrated by Sir David Attenborough.

References

External links
 

Outdoor clothing brands
British brands
Companies based in Kirklees